Natalia Soetrisno (born 9 January 1976) is a former Indonesian professional tennis player.

She made her debut as a professional in August 1989, at the age of 13, at an  ITF tournament in Jakarta, Indonesia. She won three ITF doubles titles during her career.

She was part of Indonesia's Fed Cup team in 1994.

ITF finals

Singles (0–1)

Doubles (3–5)

References

External links

Indonesian female tennis players
1976 births
Living people
Asian Games medalists in tennis
Tennis players at the 1994 Asian Games
Medalists at the 1994 Asian Games
Asian Games silver medalists for Indonesia
Southeast Asian Games gold medalists for Indonesia
Southeast Asian Games bronze medalists for Indonesia
Southeast Asian Games medalists in tennis
Competitors at the 1993 Southeast Asian Games
20th-century Indonesian women